In quantum mechanics, a Dirac membrane is a model of a charged membrane introduced by Paul Dirac in 1962. Dirac's original motivation was to explain the mass of the muon as an excitation of the ground state corresponding to an electron. Anticipating the birth of string theory by almost a decade, he was the first to introduce what is now called a type of Nambu–Goto action for membranes.

In the Dirac membrane model the repulsive electromagnetic forces on the membrane are balanced by the contracting ones coming from the positive tension. In the case of the spherical membrane, classical equations of motion imply that the balance is met for the radius , where  is the classical electron radius.

Action principle 

Dirac chose a non-standard way to formulate the action principle for the membrane. Because closed membranes in   provide a natural split of space into the interior and the exterior there exists a special curvilinear system of coordinates   in spacetime and a function   such that 
 
-   defines a membrane

-  ,   describe a region outside or inside the membrane
 
where  , is the internal parametrization of the membrane world-volume, the membrane action proposed by Dirac is

where the induced metric and the factors J and M are given by

In the above  are rectilinear and orthogonal. Note that  is just a usual action for the electromagnetic field in a curvilinear system while is the integral over the membrane world-volume i.e. precisely the type of the action used later in string theory.

Equations of motion 

They are:
- variation w.r.t.  for  - this results in sourceless Maxwell equations 
- variation w.r.t.  for  - this gives a consequence of Maxwell equations
- variation w.r.t.  for 

The last equation has a geometric interpretation: the r.h.s. is proportional to the curvature of the membrane. For the spherically symmetric case we get

Therefore, the balance condition  implies   where  is the radius of the balanced membrane. The  total energy  for the spherical membrane with radius  is
  
On the other hand, the total energy in the equilibrium should be  (in  units)
and so we obtain .

Hamiltonian formulation 

Small oscillations about the equilibrium in the spherically symmetric case imply frequencies - . Therefore, going to quantum theory,  the energy of one quantum would be .
This is much more than the muon mass but the frequencies are by no means small so this approximation may not work properly. To get a better quantum theory one needs to work out the Hamiltonian of the system and solve the corresponding Schroedinger equation.

For the Hamiltonian formulation Dirac introduces generalised momenta

- for :  - momenta conjugate to 

Then one notices the following constraints

- for the Maxwell field 

- for membrane momenta

These constraints need to be included when calculating the Hamiltonian, using the Dirac bracket method.  
The result of this calculation is  the Hamiltonian of the form

where  is the Hamiltonian for the electromagnetic field written in the curvilinear system.

Quantisation 

For spherically symmetric motion the Hamiltonian is 

however the direct quantisation is not clear due to the square-root of the differential operator. To get any further Dirac considers the Bohr - Sommerfeld method:

See also
 Brane

References 
P. A. M. Dirac, An Extensible Model of the Electron, Proc. Roy. Soc. A268, (1962) 57–67.

Quantum models
Electron